Umm al-Tuyour (also spelled Umm al-Tiyur) is a village in northwestern Syria, administratively part of the Hama Governorate, located west of Hama. Nearby localities include Kafr al-Tun to the northeast, Maarzaf to the north, Aqrab to the northwest, Deir al-Salib to the southwest, Billin to the south, al-Rabiaa to the southeast and Tayzin to the east. According to the Syria Central Bureau of Statistics (CBS), Umm al-Tuyour had a population of 2,588 in the 2004 census. Its inhabitants are predominantly Alawites.

References

Bibliography

 

Populated places in Hama District
Alawite communities in Syria